Aurivela is a genus of lizards that belongs to the family Teiidae. There are two species in the genus.  Both are endemic to Argentina.

Classification
There are two species in the genus:
Aurivela longicauda  (Bell, 1843) – longtail whiptail
Aurivela tergolaevigata (Cabrera, 2004)

References

 
Lizard genera
Taxa named by Michael B. Harvey
Taxa named by Gabriel N. Ugueto
Taxa named by Ronald L. Gutberlet Jr.